Botnia-69 is a Finnish bandy club in Helsinki. The club has won the Finnish championship four times, 1989, 1992, 1997 and 2016. In 1992 they were runners-up of the European Cup. Their home arena is the Oulunkylä Ice Rink.

In 2012, the club's P13 youth team won the Borlänge Bandy Cup in Sweden.

References

External links
Pictures from the victorious national final in 2016

External links
 Official fan page at Facebook

Bandy clubs in Finland
Bandy clubs established in 1969